Gomerina is a genus of ground beetles in the family Carabidae. There are at least two described species in Gomerina, found in the Canary Islands.

Species
These two species belong to the genus Gomerina:
 Gomerina calathiformis (Wollaston, 1865)
 Gomerina nitidicollis (Lindberg, 1953)

References

Platyninae